Joel Ward may refer to:

 Joel Ward (footballer) (born 1989), English footballer
 Joel Ward (ice hockey) (born 1980), ice hockey player
 Joel Ward (magician) (born 1983), magician
 Joel N. Ward (born 1959), foreign currency trader

See also
Joe Ward (disambiguation)